Khoren Robertovich Bayramyan (born 7 January 1992) is an Armenian professional footballer who plays for Rostov and the Armenia national team. He mostly plays in the left midfielder position, but also can play as a right midfielder or winger on either side.

Club career
Bayramyan made his Russian Premier League debut for FC Rostov on 18 June 2011 in a game against Rubin Kazan.

On 23 June 2018, Bayramyan joined Rubin Kazan on loan for the 2018–19 season.

International career
Bayramyan represented Russia on junior levels. Before the 2020–21 Russian Premier League season, the players from the countries that belong to Eurasian Economic Union (of which Armenia is one), stopped being considered foreign players in Russian leagues (there are restrictions on the number of foreign players per team). On 18 July 2020, the Football Federation of Armenia announced that Bayramyan had agreed to represent Armenia. He made his debut on 5 September 2020 in a UEFA Nations League 1–2 loss against North Macedonia.

Personal life
Bayramyan's younger brother Levon is also a professional footballer.

Career statistics

Club

International
Statistics accurate as of match played 11 October 2021.

International goals
Scores and results list Armenia's goal tally first.

References

External links
 
 

1992 births
Living people
People from Tavush Province
Armenian footballers
Armenia international footballers
Russian sportspeople of Armenian descent
Russian footballers
Russia youth international footballers
Russia under-21 international footballers
Armenian emigrants to Russia
Association football midfielders
Russian Premier League players
Russian First League players
FC Rostov players
FC Rotor Volgograd players
Naturalised citizens of Russia
FC Volgar Astrakhan players
FC Rubin Kazan players